The 1987 Formula Shell Spark Aiders season was the third season of the franchise in the Philippine Basketball Association (PBA). Known as Shell Azocord Super Bugbusters in the Reinforced Conference.

Transactions

Trades

Occurrences
Head coach Edgardo Ocampo was replaced by national team coach Joe Lipa starting the Third Conference after two dismal conferences by the team.

Import Dexter Shouse suddenly left after leading Shell to six wins and two losses in the Third Conference, taking his place is another former Shell import Dwight Anderson.

Notable dates
April 26: Formula Shell finally found a redeemer in import Calvin Thompson and struck a first-ever triumph in the Open Conference at the expense of Ginebra San Miguel, 107-104. The debuting Thompson dumped in 19 of his 44 points in the final quarter. The Spark Aiders were winless in six starts where imports Dwayne Randall and Michael Clarke played three games each and failed to lead the team to a victory.

October 4: With new coach Joe Lipa, Shell Azocord blew out defending champion Tanduay Rhum, 121-78, at the start of the Reinforced Conference. The Super Bugbusters wrapped up the contest as early in the third period and had their largest lead of 45 points four times.

October 11: Shell Azocord remains unbeaten with their third straight victory, a 109-101 win over Ginebra San Miguel.

October 17: The Super Bugbusters keeps its clean slate with five wins and sweeps the first round of eliminations by turning back San Miguel Beermen, 112-104, in an out-of-town game at the San Agustin gym in Iloilo City.

November 5: Dwight Anderson, returning as Shell's import after Dexter Shouse left, powered the Super Bugbusters to a 114-110 win over San Miguel Beermen and put Shell on top of the standings after the eliminations with a 7-3 won-loss slate.

November 12: On the eve of coach Joe Lipa's departure in Thailand to join the Philippine men's national team in defending the Cage Crown in the Southeast Asian Games, Shell nips Hills Bros, 108-106, and improved their semifinal slate to eight wins and five losses. Assistant coach Freddie Gonzales takes over for a while at the Shell bench.

Roster

Imports

References

Shell Turbo Chargers seasons
Formula